Purificación may refer to:

Places
Purificación, Tolima, a town and municipality in the Tolima department of Colombia
Purificación River (Jalisco), a river in Jalisco, Mexico
Purificación River (Tamaulipas), a river in Tamaulipas, Mexico
Villa Purificación, a town and municipality in Jalisco, Mexico
Camp Purificación, headquarters of the Federal League (1815–1820) on the eastern bank of the Uruguay River

People
Purificación Ortiz (born 1972), Spanish paralympic athlete 
Purificación "Purita" Campos (1937–2019), Spanish illustrator 
Purificación Carpinteyro Calderón (born 1961), Mexican politician and lawyer
Purificación Angue Ondo, diplomat from Equatorial Guinea
Purificacion Santamarta, Spanish paralympic athlete 
Purificación Zelaya (1866–1940), Honduran military officer, landlord and politician

See also
Purification (disambiguation)